Club Deportivo Diocesano is a football team based in Cáceres, in the autonomous community of Extremadura. Founded in 1965, it plays in Tercera División RFEF – Group 14, holding home matches at the Campo de la Federación, with a capacity of 4,000 people.

History
Founded in 1965 by Obispo D. Manuel Llopis, as a sporting section of the Colegio Diocesano de Cáceres, the club later started to sign players who were not inscribed in the school. Initially focused in youth football, the club played four seasons as a senior between 1992 and 1996 before returning to youth football.

In 2011, Diocesano merged with ACD Ciudad de Cáceres, taking their seat in the Regional Preferente. In 2017, the club achieved promotion to Tercera División for the first time ever.

Season to season

4 seasons in Tercera División
1 season in Tercera División RFEF

Notable players
 Manolo

References

External links
 
Soccerway team profile

Football clubs in Extremadura
Association football clubs established in 1965
1965 establishments in Spain
Sport in Cáceres, Spain